Holy Trinity Catholic and Church of England School is a coeducational all-through school for pupils aged from 3 to 16. The school is under the joint jurisdiction of the Roman Catholic Diocese of Hallam and the Church of England Diocese of Leeds. The school is located in Carlton Road, Barnsley, South Yorkshire, England. Holy Trinity is the only purpose built 3-16 Catholic and Church of England school in the country.

The school was formed in 2012 from the merger of St Michaels Catholic and Church of England High School, Holy Cross Deanery Church of England Primary School and St Dominic's Catholic Primary School. The school opened in a new building on land adjacent to the old High School site.

Simon Barber was the serving Headteacher of Holy Trinity since its opening, he left on 15 July 2016, leaving the school to be run by Deputy Headteacher, Mrs Anna Dickson, for Academic Year 2016–17. Anna Dickson then took over permanently to become Headteacher. She has since retired from her role, offering her retirement as of 31 August 2020.

After a critical Ofsted inspection, in January 2017 the school was put into in special measures. This led to the school being converted into an academy in May 2018 and is now sponsored by the Hallam Schools Partnership Academy Trust.

In academic year 2017-18 Mrs Parkin, the primary leader, left her post at the school. The last remaining Deputy Headteacher Mrs Lissa Oldcorn took over this post for a short period of time. Mrs Katie Falconer has since taken on the position of primary lead, after being Headteacher at Jump Primary School in Barnsley for 8 years.

From 1 September 2020, Mrs Lissa Oldcorn had taken on the role of Acting Headteacher until 20 February 2022, when she was appointed the official role of Headteacher.

References

External links
Holy Trinity Catholic and Church of England School official website
EduBase Information about the School

Primary schools in Barnsley
Secondary schools in Barnsley
Catholic primary schools in the Diocese of Hallam
Catholic secondary schools in the Diocese of Hallam
Church of England primary schools in the Diocese of Leeds
Church of England secondary schools in the Diocese of Leeds
Academies in Barnsley
2012 establishments in England
Educational institutions established in 2012